Zbigniew Andrzej Bartman (born 4 May 1987) is a Polish volleyball player, member of the Poland men's national volleyball team in 2008–2013, participant at the 2012 Olympic Games, 2009 European Champion, 2012 World League winner, silver medalist at the 2011 World Cup, Polish Champion (2013), Argentine Champion (2018).

Personal life
Zbigniew Bartman was born in 1987 in Warsaw. He has a child born in 2019.

Career
Before his career as an indoor volleyball player, Bartman played beach volleyball with Michał Kubiak. They won a gold medal at the European U-18 Championship in 2004 and a silver medal at the World U-18 Championship, also in 2004. Both Kubiak and Bartman gave up playing beach volleyball.

Clubs
Bartman debuted in PlusLiga for the club MOS Wola Warszawa during a match against Skra Bełchatów in 2003. In 2013/2014, he played for Italian club Casa Modena. With the Italian team, he played in the semifinals of the Italian Championship, but lost in matches against Lube Banca Macerata. In July 2014, Bartman announced he would be returning to Polish club, Jastrzębski Węgiel, where he played in the 2012/2013 season. His team took 4th place in 2014–15 PlusLiga. On 19 June 2015 he announced that he moved to Chinese team Sichuan Chengdu, together with Michal Lasko – one of his teammates from previous club. In February 2016 Bartman decided to change club and moved to French Stade Poitevin Poitiers because of the injury crisis affecting the French club.

National team
In 2009, he won a gold medal in the European Championship. He began his career as an outside hitter, but the coach of Polish national team at the time, Andrea Anastasi, persuaded him to change his position on the court to wing-spiker. On 14 September 2009 he was awarded Knight's Cross of Polonia Restituta. The Order was conferred on the following day by the Prime Minister of Poland, Donald Tusk. With the Polish national team, he won two medals in 2011: silver at World Cup and bronze at World League, where during the Poland - Bulgaria match, he was injured. For this reason, he did not participate in the European Championship, where his teammates won bronze medals. He was a gold medalist at the World League 2012 in Sofia, Bulgaria. In addition, he received an award for Best Spiker.

Sporting achievements

Clubs
 FIVB Club World Championship
  Doha 2011 – with Jastrzębski Węgiel
 National championships
 2007/2008  Turkish Championship, with Halkbank Ankara
 2012/2013  Polish Championship, with Asseco Resovia
 2017/2018  Argentine SuperCup, with UPCN Vóley Club
 2017/2018  Argentine Championship, with UPCN Vóley Club

Youth national team
 2005  CEV U19 European Championship

Beach volleyball
 2004  CEV U18 European Championship, with Michał Kubiak
 2004  FIVB U19 World Championship, with Michał Kubiak

Individual awards
 2012: Memorial of Hubert Jerzy Wagner – Best Spiker
 2012: FIVB World League – Best Spiker

State awards
 2009:  Knight's Cross of Polonia Restituta

External links
 Player profile at CEV.eu
 Player profile at PlusLiga.pl
 Player profile at Volleybox.net

References

1987 births
Living people
Volleyball players from Warsaw
Polish men's volleyball players
Olympic volleyball players of Poland
Volleyball players at the 2012 Summer Olympics
Polish Champions of men's volleyball
Knights of the Order of Polonia Restituta
Polish expatriate sportspeople in Italy
Expatriate volleyball players in Italy
Polish expatriate sportspeople in Turkey
Expatriate volleyball players in Turkey
Polish expatriate sportspeople in Russia
Expatriate volleyball players in Russia
Polish expatriate sportspeople in China
Expatriate volleyball players in China
Polish expatriate sportspeople in France
Expatriate volleyball players in France
Polish expatriate sportspeople in Qatar
Expatriate volleyball players in Qatar
Polish expatriate sportspeople in Argentina
Expatriate volleyball players in Argentina
AZS Częstochowa players
Projekt Warsaw players
Jastrzębski Węgiel players
Resovia (volleyball) players
Modena Volley players
Stal Nysa players
Galatasaray S.K. (men's volleyball) players
Outside hitters
Opposite hitters